The Konkomba people are a Gur ethnic group residing mainly in the Northern, Brong Ahafo, Volta, Eastern and Greater Accra Regions of Ghana. Saboba, Chereponi and Nanumba Districts, Gushiegu and Karaga districts, Zabzugu and Tatale-Sanguli districts in the Northern Region and the Nkwanta North and South Districts in the Volta Region are a few examples of administrative districts where Bikpakpaam are seen in huge populations. Other key towns of Bikpakpaam in Ghana are Atebubu, Kintampo, Techiman and Yeji in the Brong Ahafo Region. According to the Act 280 of the Anatomy act of Ghana, the Konkomba people (known as Bikpakpaam) are the second largest ethnic group in the Northern Region of Ghana. 

The 2010 census data indicates that Bikpakpaam in Ghana number 823,000 and applying the intercensal growth rate would give a population of more than one million now. CIA The World Factbook reports in Demographics of Ghana that Konkomba people are the 8th largest Ethnic group in Ghana representing 3.5% of the Total population of Ghana. Saboba (Chabob) in the Northern Region of Ghana is the capital town of all Bikpakpaam in Ghana. Bikpakpaam are also found in the republic of Togo, a sister West African country to Ghana. In Togo Bikpakpaam reside mainly in the Kara, Central and Plateaux Regions. Guerin Kouka (a.k.a. Nanguem Do, the capital of Dankpen district) in the Kara Region is the capital town of Bikpakpaam in Togo. Dankpen district is located in the north western corridor of Togo. In Schwartz's (2005) account, Bikpakpaam number about 50,100 in Togo. The 2011 census in Togo indicates however that the total population of Bikpakpaam in Dankpen district alone was 122,209. 

Visit Konkomba language for more information. Konkomba people speak Konkomba language a.k.a. Likpakpaln. The traditional dance of Konkomba people is Kinachunŋ (pronounced k-i-naa-chung). All Konkomba settlements are led by a traditional chief called Ubor. In Bikpakpaam dominant areas, the people have instituted or established their own chieftains who serve as overlords of the settlements. For instance, the Saboba area has the Uchabob-bor as the overlord. Bikpakpaam strongly believe in solidarity, determination and hard-work. 

Until the turn of the 21st century, their primary occupation was farming and animal husbandry. In occupational terms, Bikpakpaam are mainly subsistence farmers and rearers of animals such as poultry, small ruminants and cattle. This, probably, explains their scattered settlement across the West African sub-region. Indeed, Maasole intimates that Bikpakpaam have always been on the move, in search for fertile farmlands. Most Konkombas are actively in education today and a recent research projects that Konkombas will become a dominant force in politics, health, education and the civil society by 2025.

Origin and ethnogenesis 
The Konkomba natively refer to themselves as Bikpakpaam (plural form) and to their language as Likpakpaln. A male member of the tribe is denoted as ukpakpaanja while a female takes ukpakpaanpii. However, the anglicized form, ‘Konkomba’ has been the term commonly used to refer to both the people and the language. Bikpakpaam are an aboriginal people of northern Ghana. Rattray (1932) talks of Bikpakpaam as an important ethnic grouping in the northern territories of Ghana. Maasole (2006) also described Bikpakpaam as, ‘aboriginal’ people of Northern Ghana. Before the arrival of many other ethnic groups in the northern regions of Ghana in the 1400s and 1500s, Bikpakpaam were already settled in the area. Visit Konkomba language to learn more (genetic root, alphabets, phonetic...) about the Likpakpaln (Konkomba language).

Origin and History 
The origin of Bikpakpaam has been a subject of research for a long time now. It is on record that Bikpakpaam settled more widely in the eastern corridor before the arrival of many other ethnic groups in the northern regions of Ghana in the 1400s and 1500s,. Bikpakpaam then migrated into other territories in the first half of twentieth century, partly occasioned by colonial pressures and partly in search of fertile farmlands. This opened the door for other tribes to enter and occupy their lands.

The history of where Bikpakpaam came from to settle in Ghana is not well known. What is known, however, is that Bikpakpaam occupied the area called Kyali/Chare (now Yendi) until the Dagombas advanced further east with their expansion and pushed them further away with the support of the colonial masters. Fynn (1971) asserts 'we know that the ancestors of the Dagombas met a people akin to the Konkomba already living in northern Ghana’.

According to narratives by elders of Kikpakpaan, the Gonjas, under Ndewura Jakpa, defeated Dagombas under Ya Na Dariziogo and compelled the latter to abandon their capital (currently believed to be Tamale/Kumbungu areas) and move it to its present site, Yendi, which was then a Bikpakpaam town called Chare. The newcomers pushed back Bikpakpaam and established divisions among them. Despite the assertion of suzerainty, Dagombas seem never to have exercised close control over Bikpakpaam.

According to Martin (1976), the Dagombas pushed back the Konkomba and established divisional chiefs among them. The main towns had the character of outposts, strategically located on the east bank of the River Oti but Bikpakpaam were by no means assimilated. Relations between them and the Dagombas were distant and hostile. There was little, if any, mixing by marriage. Part of the oral history of the creation of Dagbon suggests that the Dagombas conquered Bikpakpaam when they moved into the eastern part of the Northern Region. Bikpakpaam however have vehemently and consistently refused the claim that they were in the battle against Dagombas. The Konkomba have often insisted that they voluntarily moved away, in search for fertile lands and greener pastures for their livestock, when Dagombas arrived. David Tait (1964) quotes an elder of Bikpakpaam as saying “When we were growing up and met our fathers, they told us they (our forefathers) stayed in Yaan/Chare (Yendi) with the Kabre and Bikwom. The Dagombas at the time lived mainly in Tamale and Kumbungu from where they rose, mounted their horses and moved towards Yendi”. We saw the horses and had to move further east.

Pre-colonial and modern day organization 
Bikpakpaam pre-colonial political organization was centered on districts inhabited by clans whose status and autonomy were represented through the presence of ubor (chief) and an earth-shrine tendered by a religious leader, utindaan (the earth priest). Ubor is the administrative and judiciary leader of Bikpakpaam communities. The main duties of ubor include (but not limited to) maintaining peace, unity, order, justice and liaise with other chiefs to maintain harmony and settle conflicts and disputes. Utindaan, is an important figure not only among Bikpakpaam, but also among the other tribes of Ghana, especially among ‘Gur’ ethnic groups. This term Utindaan means the keeper of the land, to some and to others, it means the first settler on the land. Literary it means the “land owner.” The utindaan had and continues to have overlordship of an entire settlement, more in the exercise of spiritual duties and powers over the place. Ubor and utindaan work together to sell or apportion land to individuals. Historically, the earth priest (utindaan) first settled in the ancient town of Kyali/Chare, present Yendi in the Northern Region.

In modern days, the duties of ubor have been extended. Ubor is the mouth piece of the people, giving authorization and approval for development activities. Ubor works hand-in-hand with the political, non-governmental, and religious leaders to ensure the welfare and development of the entire community. The chief's palace (kinakok) is the first point of call for any government agency or development partner visiting the community for development or any other purpose. Kinakok is a highly respected and prestigious office having a linguist ubonabr a.k.a. (wunlaan), a scribe (ugbangmeer), a chief priest, council of elders, foot soldiers, body guards and servants. Ubor is the head and chief executive officer of kinakok. Kinakok also serves as a traditional court yard for settlement of conflicts and disputes. Fines are often imposed on guilty individuals for a peaceful settlement of conflicts and disputes. Culturally ubor is polygamous because many women are betrothed onto him from various clans.

Next to the authority of the utindaan was the uninkpel, a clan head. The position of uninkpel is almost invariably reserved for the most elderly man of a clan. Each Bikpakpaam clan has an uninkpel who also oversees the affairs of his clan. Uninkpel and utindaan work hand-in-hand and report to ubor who is the boss.

The developmental social structure of Bikpakpaam boast of youth leadership known as KOYA (Konkomba Youth Association). KOYA functions mainly in uniting Bikpakpaam, promoting peace and development among Bikpakpaam, educating Bikpakpaam on the importance of education and also on the need to do away with outdated cultural practices. KOYA also mediate inter and intra-tribal conflict resolution. KOYA has many branches across Bikpakpaam settlements in Ghana and foreign branches in U.S.A. and United Kingdom.

Bikpakpaam also have a leader for the youth and young adults called unachiponbor (young chief). Unachiponbor coordinates and promotes peace, unity and communalism among the youth. He ensures that all young men and women get adequate support from other youth during marriage ceremonies, He also leads the young men to plow farmlands for parents-in-law (as part of dowry) in the form of communal labor. Unachiponbor also leads his fellow youth to dig the grave of a parent-in-law, and offer a befitting kinachung during the funerals of a parent-in-law.

Bikpakpaam Culture 
Bikpakpaam Beliefs:
The Bikpakpaam have many beliefs just as other tribes. Bikpakpaam believe in the existence of a Supreme Being ‘Uwumbor’ (God) who is upheld as the uncreated creator of everything. Uwumbor controls all things and delegates power to other smaller gods and spirit beings under Him to take care of prescribed creatures. Bikpakpaam also believe that Uwumbor gives each individual his own destiny and no one has powers to change his or her own destiny or the destiny of another person. God the creator is the only one who knows one's destiny.

There is also the belief among the Bikpakpaam that God created every person and it is God alone who can direct the trajectory of life of the individual or determine his or her life span. If one has not completed the assigned purpose for him or her on earth, God would never take him back i.e. God will not let the person die, but if it happens, God will let the person reincarnate to complete the assignment. Such reincarnated persons have special identifiable names such as Jagri (a reincarnated male), Piigri (a reincarnated female), N-ya (my grandmother), for reincarnated female, N-yaja (my grandfather) for a reincarnated male.

Bikpakpaam believe that there are evil spirits which torment people in the form of sickness, poverty, conflicts, drought, still births, deformities, deaths, mental disorders etc. They also believe in the existence of counter spirits (good ones), which counteract the attacks of the evil spirits. Furthermore, Bikpakpaam believe in ancestral spirits (the existence of the spirit of the dead), which they call Bitekpiib. They are of the view that these ancestral spirits take vengeance on enemies, protects the rest of the family and care for the general well being of the surviving relations. They, thence, pour libation and perform sacrifices to appease the ancestral spirits.

These indigenous Bikpakpaam beliefs are fading out and giving way to Christianity and Islam. Most Bikpakpaam of post-colonial era have embraced Christianity and believe in the Triune God (the Father, Son and Holy Spirit). As such, Saboba and other Bikpakpaam localities are home to many denominational churches including the Catholic Church, Orthodox, Pentecostal and Charismatic churches. About 5% or less of Bikpakpaam are Muslims.

Bikpakpaam hospitality:Bikpakpaam are friendly and welcoming people. Renowned for their hospitality, a typical Bikpakpaam family will take in visitors, offer them water to drink, and slaughter a domestic bird or small ruminant to prepare a meal for the visitor. They make visitors feel at home and part of their family. They also give souvenirs and livestock for keeping to their visitors. Bikpakpaam relate cordially with their neighbors and show great respect to everyone without discrimination. They often treat visitors or guests better than they treat themselves. Bikpakpaam boast of a rich diversity of art works and traditional costumes.  The art work and colorful and fancy indigenous costumes of traditional dances (kinachung, njeem, ichaa, tibaln, nbanba etc.) make Saboba and other Bikpakpaam settlements and environs a thrilling and rewarding tourist destination to explore.

Inheritance among the Bikpakpaam: 
Bikpakpaam inheritance is patrilineal. Every child of Kikpakpaan belongs to the father's lineage and will inherit properties of his/her father. The patrilineal inheritance, however, shows great reverence and respect to the maternal relationships, which is mainly seen and used as a second home for the child and also as a place of asylum in times of patrilineal hostilities. Mothers and children also use the maternal families as a prolific ground for investments. The paternal family pays great homage to the maternal family by plowing one of their fields into farmland every year for free. In addition, the maternal families are entitled to a lavish and honorable parent-in-law funeral sponsored by the paternal family.

The Ingenuity of Bikpakpaam:
Bikpakpaam are clever and innovative in their traditional settings. Inventions by the forefathers of Bikpakpaam include farm implements/tools, musical instruments, hunting tools/weapons such as liluul, butom, ilopiin, kakpola, kitaln etc., Their architectural and construction prowess and techniques led to domestic structures like libubul, lipil, kachala, kikpawung, and n-yaam (for painting), tinabin (cow dung) (for plastering houses) etc. Some musical instruments are liwul (flute), kibeek (guitar), ligangaln (drum), kiwujabik (type of flute), lidabuln (type of drum) and ukpiihn (horn). Cultural costumes include unaa (decorated horns), tangana (traditional cloth), tanbena (dancing cloth decorated with beads and pearls), tibaan (jingles) etc., Household utensils/detergents include libuul (clay coolers), nkin (clay pot), sagbo (jar), kiyiik (calabash), bukpakpaankiib (traditional soap) among others.

Bravery and hardwork of Bikpakpaam:
The core values of Bikpakpaam include: bravery, hard work, determination, generosity, hospitality, courage, and collectivism, love of family life and support for family members. This hard working attribute evolved as a component of their culture which requires every adolescent to work hard enough to plow their own farm land and that of their parents in the same season in order to become economically independent and raise their own families. In their hay days, typical Bikpakpaam farmers will plow their own yam farm manually, boasting of 15,000-20,000 yam mounds yearly. This is evident in the fact that Bikpakpaam are the major yam producers in Ghana and Togo. In Ghana, Bikpakpaam are proud to feed the nation and even export yam through the Konkomba Yam Market in Agbogbloshie, Accra. In addition to yam farming, Bikpakpaam farmers also boast of maize, guinea corn, and millet and rice farms. Bikpakpaam women care for the men as they plow the fields, but also plow their own fields where they grow mainly vegetables and legumes (groundnuts, and beans). Women also gather fruits for economic gain namely shea nuts (used to make shea butter) and dawadawa fruits, which have a diversified use. Bikpakpaam women are also excellent in harvest and post harvest processing and marketing of foodstuff. Gathering of firewood and charcoal production for both domestic and commercial use are integral part of Bikpakpaam women duties. The brewing of a local drink known as ndamam (“red drink”) popularly known as pito is a natural gift and preserve of women.
Animal rearing is also practiced by Bikpakpaam for domestic consumption and commercial purposes. Such animals include birds (fowls, guinea fowls, ducks, and doves), ruminants (mainly goats, sheep, and cattle) and pigs. In recent times, some farmers have delved into guinea pig, grasscutter and rabbit farming for commercial purposes. Bikpakpaam farmers also now boast of large plantations of fruit trees, mainly mango and cashew trees. The practice of collective solidarity in the form of communal labor termed as nkpawiin depicts hardwork, unity and collaboration among Bikpakpaam communities. Here, individuals seek help from the entire community to meet labour needs (farming, construction and other forms of work) and this occurs in turns. Bikpakpaam are swift, brave and security conscious.

Bikpakpaam foods and drinks:
Bikpakpaam eat what they grow/farm/rear. Bikpakpaam foods are very healthy and reflect in their healthy conditions. Their staple foods include “Bisatom” (literarly, “hot food”) commonly known in Ghana as “tuo zafi” (TZ), “sakɔla” commonly known in Ghana as “fufu” made with pounded yam, “likaal/kalaa/tubani” made with beans flour, millet and a combination of many other foods. In their quest to achieve a balanced diet, the forefathers of Bikpakpaam discovered a wide range of healthy vegetables; some of which are indigenous but others are well known and common in other areas. These include but not limited to: “imuan” (okra), “tinyangban” (hibiscus), “kijuuk(English name not identified)”, “timonfar” (okra leaves), “likpakajul” (sesame leaves), “litukal” (baobab leaves), “kikotumok (English name not identified)”, “tignaafar (English name not identified) “inangbanatun (English name not identified)”, tigbufar (kapok leaves), “suwaka”, (bitter leaves), “unaa” (spinach) and many more. These vegetables are used to prepare soup, stews or as sides in combination with the staple foods.

The ingenious, original and authentic Bikpakpaam drink is called “Pito”. Pito is a delicious traditional beer brewed from scratch using organic guinea corn with natural ingredients and no artificial flavors and no preservatives. Pito is brewed fermented or non-fermented. The fermented Pito is excellent for “happy hour”, funerals, parties and other celebrations. Non-fermented Pito is consumed as a beverage for various purposes. The rich diversity of Bikpakpaam foods can also boast of tubers like yam, cassava, potato and grains like maize, millet, guinea corn, “ipui”, and rice, sesame seeds (“kpaka” and “jam-jam”) melon seeds (“inabe” and “keer”) and many more.

Bikpakpaam names:
Bikpakpaam believe the name one bears influences his/her life. Good names bring success and prosperity to a person. As such, great care is taken in choosing names for children. Bikpakpaam naming world is vast as it incorporates all categories of names-circumstantial, positional, proverbial, ironical and rhetoric as well as flora and fauna names etc. Some of the names given to children are indicative of special event(s) associated with a child's birth or inspired by special thought or wishes by relations. Names among Bikpakpaan can also be proverbial or insinuative in response to surrounding situations and/or circumstances or conveying a message to neighbors/relatives. This rich naming system render Bikpakpaam names very unique and attractive in appellation.

Culturally, the mother's parents/family choose the name given to the 1st born of every woman and the man's parents/family, or the husband and wife choose the name given to subsequent children based on mutual consent. When a child is born, a fowl is sent to the woman's family as a gift to announce the birth of the child. A male poultry indicates the child is a male child and vice versa. The essence of this gift is to start an investment for he child's future. Few days-weeks later a special day is set aside to name the child, amidst merry making (eating, drinking, singing, and dancing…..).The Konkombas people 

Examples of Konkomba names and their meanings:

                   Tanamwir: Our Kingdom is great
                   Wumborja: The Lord our defense
                   N-Muanbindo: There is joy in my house
                   Barkei: “patience”
                   Ndonbi: I am thankful to them
                   Wumborgnan: God is good
                   Wumborkan: God has seen
                   Banyubala: They do not boast
                   Bilinsun: They have forgotten what they said
                   Nkumpoi: Death is stubborn
                   Tabime: Do not denigrate me
                   Biyakakumi: If only they spare my life
                   Ulanja: “jovial”
                   Iwunliin: Destiny
                   Ujakpa: “strong like a shark”
                   Wumborti: God's gift
                   Wumborbe: God lives
                   Nsimbaan: One blood
                   Nsanyaan: The good way
                   Nignan: It is good 
                   Kajah: Born under a shed or summer hut
                   Bindan: They should come

Other names:

                   Dana and Dawon: Males twins
                   Pona and Powon: Female twins
                   Nakoja: Male born after twins
                   Nakol: Female born after twins
                   Napari: Second born after twins (both male and female)
                   Sanja: Male born on the road during a commute
                   Sanpu: Female born on the road during a commute
                   Jabaab: Male twin whose twin brother/sister dies before the naming ceremony.
                   Pibaab: Female twin whose twin brother/sister dies before the naming ceremony

Bikpakpaam Housing:
Since the pre-colonial era, many Bikpakpaam families live together in their traditional family houses. When the young men and women are grown and get married they leave the family house to establish their own families. The houses are made of round or rectangular rooms built, from laterite (clay) and roofed with thatch. Bikpakpaam women boast of invention of the traditional paint known as n-yam made from Dawadawa fruit pod and used for painting and decorating interior of rooms. Post-colonial developments led to the introduction of cemented brick and block and cemented houses, roofed with zinc sheets.

Some traditional rites of Bikpakpaam

Marriage rites:
Bikpakpaam marriages have evolved along several pillars. The traditional betrothal and exchange marriage types have made way to a more open and unrestricted marriage system. Nonetheless, the customs accompanying these marriages have remained. In the current marriage system, the groom's family farms and contributes severally in the form of dowry to the bride's family. These numerous contributions have now been reduced drastically to just a simple dowry paid to the bride family subject to the financial strength of the groom's family. The bride's family also submits a list of items (clothing, kitchen and household items) to the groom's family to purchase for the bride. In the betrothal system, females at infancy or childhood were betrothed to, sometimes, aged adult men who wait for them to grow for marriage. This practice is outdated and no longer in use because betrothed women who did not like their betrothed husbands deserted the marriage and absconded and sometimes committed suicide. The marriages of today are constructed between individual lovers who after falling into a relationship introduce the prospective spouses to their families for assessment and acceptance. Before marriage, the lady also usually visits the man's home temporary (to study and in turn, be assessed by the man's family) and later, permanently moves to the home when the marriage has been contracted. Christianity has influenced this modern trend in current marriage system among Bikpakpaam.

Another prominent phenomenon that is waning in Bikpakpaam marriage system is polygyny. Formerly, a typical ukpakpanja could marry more than one wife, depending on his social and financial strength. Now due to Christianity, economic hardship, rivalry and modernity, the polygamy is fading out and most men now marry just one wife and a maximum of two except biborb (chiefs) who still marry many wives betrothed onto them by clans and well wishers. In a typical Bikpakpaam community today, one may still find cases where a woman may marry a relative of her deceased husband.

Burial rites:
Bikpakpaam traditionally bury their dead within a maximum of 24 hours post death (aside the recent introduction of keeping corpses in the morgue and burial with coffin). When a person, whether a child or an adult dies, messages such as verbal, horn/flute sound and explosive gunpowder (for older people) are sent to neighbors in the surrounding communities and to relatives far and near. For adult men and women (married and having children), kinachung always accompanies the burial services. Infants, children and adolescents receive a similar burial without kinachung and, many a time, without a coffin. 
The deceased is laid in state and burial rites are performed. There is mourning (ikpowiil), ikpolahn (dirges), njeem, etc. based on the cause of death or status of the deceased. The corpse is bathed by a large number of women, dressed and may be coffined. The corpse (coffined or not) is carried by men on the shoulder or head and one of the traditional priest invokes ancestral spirits to identify the cause of death. The corpse is then sent to the gravesite, which is usually in front of the house for adults and far away from home for kids and adolescents. Causes of death like drowning, bush fires, death in pregnancy, death of a twin all have special rites. Males are buried facing the sunrise (east) to remind them of daybreak and onset of farming activities whilst females face sunset (west) to remind them of end-of-day to do household chores and prepare diner for the whole family. As indicated both burial positions have cultural connotations.  A few farewell tributes including the gift of money, valuables and verbal messages are said to the deceased before interment. Kinachung and other funeral rites continue after the burial ceremony.

Funeral rites:
Bikpakpaam have two main forms of funeral rites. Just as the burial rites, these are also primed on the cause of death and status of the deceased.  There is a three days (males) or four days (females) post-burial funeral rite during which the clothes of the deceased are washed by female relatives. This is seen as a minor event. The first funeral rite is called Lisaatong (literally -putting food on table) is performed for only adults. It is characterized by converging of relatives, neighbors and sympathizers at the funeral grounds to serve food to the spirit of the dead. A four-legged animal (usually a cow) is slaughtered and a sumptuous meal (bisatom) is prepared for all but a plate of the meal is served and left in the room of the deceased person overnight to feed and calm his/her spirit, which otherwise is believed will pester the living by scavenging the kitchen for food every night. For hospitality, many other animals can be slaughtered, including cattle, sheep, goats, pigs and fowls and food (bisatom) is served to all visitors and sympathizers.  Night and day kinachung and ichaa, ngben dances are performed. During these dances, food and drinks (Pito, soda, tea....) are served to all visitors and accommodation provided where need be.
The last and final funeral rite is what is termed Likpuul (funeral proper). This can be after a few days or weeks or months for a kid or after several years for adults, especially utindaan. Just like Lisaachↄng, likpuul involves convergence of relatives and sympathizers. The Bikpakpaam pito drinks are prepared and served, and many animals (more than during the lisaachↄng) are slaughtered to cater for the masses of funeral attendants. This usually takes 5-7days and is performed for an accumulated number of deceased people. On the 3rd day, ubua (a soothsayer) consults the deceased as well the ancestors of the deceased to speak to the relatives about the cause of their death and other family/communal issues that need spiritual redress. Kinachung and other dances are performed over the entire likpuul program. Additional rites like the widowhood and orphan hood rites as well as inheritance are usually performed in the last few days of likpuul. 
Christianity has influenced all these funeral rites simplified and reduced to a burial church service in 3 days (men) or 4 days (women). At the bereaved family's discretion, a date is set aside for the final funeral rite. Usually there is wake keeping on Friday, a funeral church service on Saturday and a thanksgiving church service on Sunday marking the end of the funeral.

Ndinpondaan festival 
Ndipondaan (literally meaning; new guineacorn drink) Festival is currently the most widely celebrated festival among Bikpakpaam. Others like the fire festival (naminsee) and the new yam festivals (n-nidak) are less celebrated today due to foreign cultural influences and modernity. Currently, efforts are underway to revive and bring back the celebration of these festivals. 
Ndipondaan festival is celebrated by Bikpakpaam to thank almighty God, ancestors and the gods for a bumper harvest of guinea corn and other food crops. This festival is recently attracting public attention. This is an annual event during which there is homecoming for all Bikpakpaam in the world over to Saboba, their capital. During Ndipondaan, many events, including games, dancing competitions and other cultural rites are revised and performed. Opportunity from this event is used in tracing ancestral lineages of individuals, visits to major Bikpakpaam landmarks, tourism activities and re-union of families. Other educational and sensitization programmes and projects are initiated or delivered during Ndipondaan celebration. Issues that affect Kikpkakpaan are addressed and communities or their representatives advised accordingly. Ndipondaan also serves as a time of mediation of internal differences and settlement of outstanding conflicts. One consistent ritual, however, has been an opening prayer to almighty God, a word of exhortation from the clergy, the performance of libation and sacrifice to ancestors, traditional dance, and the sharing of food and drinks with visitors and relatives. Many Bikpakpaam delicacies, including bisaatom, and sakↄla are prepared and eaten. Pito, the favorite guineacorn drink is also brewed in large quantities and enjoyed by all.

References

  

Ethnic groups in Ghana